The Marianist Family is a group of four Catholic organizations which trace their origins to the Blessed William Joseph Chaminade and Blessed Adèle de Batz de Trenquelléon. 

The Family's four branches are the Society of Mary (Marianists) (S.M.), a religious institute of priests and religious brothers; the Daughters of Mary Immaculate (F.M.I.), an institute of religious sisters; the Alliance Mariale (A.M.), an historically all-female secular institute, composed of laypeople, who "dedicate their lives to God by taking vows while living in the world"; and the Marianist Lay Communities (M.L.C.), a private association of the faithful for both men and women.

References

External links
 Marianist International Home Page

Catholic orders and societies
Secular institutes
de:Marianisten
fr:Marianistes
it:Società di Maria (Marianisti)
nl:Marianisten
pl:Marianiści